Gary Holmgren is an American former professional boxer who competed from 1974 to 1984.

Professional career
Holmgren made his professional debut on May 15, 1974, with a first-round knockout win against Milton Buckley in St Paul, Minnesota.  His first loss came in only his second fight, a five-round points loss to Bruce Finch, who would go on to make a name for himself as a welterweight contender.  Holmgren would follow up that loss with a stretch in which he won 16 of 17 fights, including a decision win against 21-2 Rory O'Shea in 1975.  Holmgren's career peaked in January 1983 when he won the Minnesota junior middleweight title by defeating Rafael Rodriguez on points in a ten-rounder. Holmgren retired afterwards, having compiled a career record of 22 wins and 5 losses, with 12 wins coming by way of knockout.

Professional boxing record

|-
|align="center" colspan=8|22 Wins (12 knockouts, 10 decisions), 5 Losses (2 knockouts, 3 decisions) 
|-
| align="center" style="border-style: none none solid solid; background: #e3e3e3"|Result
| align="center" style="border-style: none none solid solid; background: #e3e3e3"|Record
| align="center" style="border-style: none none solid solid; background: #e3e3e3"|Opponent
| align="center" style="border-style: none none solid solid; background: #e3e3e3"|Type
| align="center" style="border-style: none none solid solid; background: #e3e3e3"|Round
| align="center" style="border-style: none none solid solid; background: #e3e3e3"|Date
| align="center" style="border-style: none none solid solid; background: #e3e3e3"|Location
| align="center" style="border-style: none none solid solid; background: #e3e3e3"|Notes
|-align=center
|Loss
|
|align=left| Brian Brunette
|SD
|10
|February 1, 1984
|align=left| Saint Paul, Minnesota, U.S.
|align=left|
|-
|Win
|
|align=left| Rafael Rodriguez
|UD
|10
|January 25, 1983
|align=left| Saint Paul, Minnesota, U.S.
|align=left|
|-
|Win
|
|align=left| Bruce Strauss
|PTS
|10
|October 7, 1981
|align=left| Saint Paul, Minnesota, U.S.
|align=left|
|-
|Win
|
|align=left| Darrell "Ageless Wonder" Green
|KO
|4
|May 6, 1981
|align=left| Saint Paul, Minnesota, U.S.
|align=left|
|-
|Loss
|
|align=left| Dave Boy Green
|TKO
|6
|January 27, 1981
|align=left| Kensington, England
|align=left|
|-
|Win
|
|align=left| "Boxing" Tony Taylor
|UD
|10
|October 29, 1980
|align=left| Saint Paul, Minnesota, U.S.
|align=left|
|-
|Win
|
|align=left| Emmett Atlas
|KO
|2
|March 19, 1980
|align=left| Saint Paul, Minnesota, U.S.
|align=left|
|-
|Loss
|
|align=left| Tyrone Wren
|PTS
|6
|June 29, 1978
|align=left| Saint Paul, Minnesota, U.S.
|align=left|
|-
|Win
|
|align=left| Al Franklin
|UD
|10
|December 9, 1976
|align=left| Saint Paul, Minnesota, U.S.
|align=left|
|-
|Win
|
|align=left| Rory "Stylish Irish" O'Shea
|UD
|10
|November 9, 1976
|align=left| Saint Paul, Minnesota, U.S.
|align=left|
|-
|Win
|
|align=left|Moses Gregg
|KO
|2
|October 11, 1976
|align=left| Evanston, Indiana, U.S.
|align=left|
|-
|Win
|
|align=left| Harvey "Candyman" Wilson
|KO
|1
|August 4, 1976
|align=left| Mounds View, Minnesota, U.S.
|align=left|
|-
|Win
|
|align=left| Ron Pettigrew
|KO
|6
|June 30, 1976
|align=left| Saint Paul, Minnesota, U.S.
|align=left|
|-
|Win
|
|align=left| Woody "Walden Tweed" Harris
|UD
|6
|April 22, 1976
|align=left| Bloomington, Minnesota, U.S.
|align=left|
|-
|Win
|
|align=left| Jerry Wells
|UD
|6
|January 22, 1976
|align=left| Saint Paul, Minnesota, U.S.
|align=left|
|-
|Win
|
|align=left| Dennis Haggerty
|KO
|1
|November 25, 1975
|align=left| Globe, Arizona, U.S.
|align=left|
|-
|Win
|
|align=left| Woody "Walden Tweed" Harris
|PTS
|5
|November 13, 1975
|align=left| Bloomington, Minnesota, U.S.
|align=left|
|-
|Loss
|
|align=left| Ricardo Thomatis
|TKO
|3
|June 6, 1975
|align=left| Minneapolis, Minnesota, U.S.
|align=left|
|-
|Win
|
|align=left| Rory "Stylish Irish" O'Shea
|SD
|6
|April 23, 1975
|align=left| Bloomington, Minnesota, U.S.
|align=left|
|-
|Win
|
|align=left| Efran Maldonado
|KO
|1
|March 19, 1975
|align=left| Minneapolis, Minnesota, U.S.
|align=left|
|-
|Win
|
|align=left| Timothy "Tim" Adams
|PTS
|6
|February 3, 1975
|align=left| Minneapolis, Minnesota, U.S.
|align=left|
|-
|Win
|
|align=left| Jim "Bad Ass" Hearn
|KO
|4
|December 3, 1974
|align=left| Saint Paul, Minnesota, U.S.
|align=left|
|-
|Win
|
|align=left| Bobby "Bruin" Orr
|KO
|1
|August 28, 1974
|align=left| Saint Paul, Minnesota, U.S.
|align=left|
|-
|Win
|
|align=left| Johnny "O.J." Simpson
|TKO
|2
|July 31, 1974
|align=left| Bloomington, Minnesota, U.S.
|align=left|
|-
|Win
|
|align=left| Maurice Sanders
|TKO
|2
|June 26, 1974
|align=left| Saint Paul, Minnesota, U.S.
|align=left|
|-
|Loss
|
|align=left| Bruce Finch
|PTS
|5
|May 23, 1974
|align=left| Minneapolis, Minnesota, U.S.
|align=left|
|-
|Win
|
|align=left| Milton Buckley
|KO
|1
|May 15, 1974
|align=left| Saint Paul, Minnesota, U.S.
|align=left|
|}

Retirement
Holmgren retired from professional boxing after 27 fights. He went on to become a firefighter, rising to captain in a 22-year career.

Notes

External links
 

1950 births
Living people
American male boxers
Light-middleweight boxers
Boxers from Minnesota